Akvan Div is a fantasy creature who appears in the role of Div. The subject of the story goes back to the time of Kay Khosrow. He can either disappear from view or become an onager or become a storm. In this story Akwan Div is in the onager herds with a brilliant body.

The emergence of Akvan Div
Akvan Div emerges after a long period of war with the Turks. Kay Khosrow King of Iran has completed the Great War with Kamus Kashani. And all of his troops are at rest.

One day Shepherd Kayi khosrow came to the Palace  and complained that an onager had fled from the herd like a lion. The color of the body, like the glowing sun, a black line from its edge to its tail. It is like a big horse with four strong Hand  and feet. Kay khosrow realizes he is not an onager but a demon. All the warriors were present. Then Kikhosro ordered Rustam to destroy that particular div.

Akvan Divi could become wind  or disguise himself. When Rostam reached the plain, he waited three days and on the fourth day he saw onager herds fleeing. But among the bright onager flock she was escaping to find that she was the demon. Rostam the rope  out to catch him, but Akvan disappeared. Rostam now knew that he would not have a good fight with him. He tried to kill Akvan several times, but he disappeared every time until Rostam became tired and needed sleep and rest

The story of Rostam after killing Akvan
Rostam returned to his sleeping spring, but did not find Rakhsh. He set out on foot and reached a farm. There he found his horse with a herd of Afrasiab horses, then mounted the horse and took the herd of Afrasiab horses with him. Rostam was attacked by the Afrasiab Corps at the end of work and fought with all of the Turanian soldiers  one trunk. He killed more than a hundred people in the battle.

References

Sources
Ferdowsi Shahnameh. From the Moscow version. Mohammed Publishing.

External links

Shahnameh characters
Shahnameh stories
Daevas